Huancabamba may refer to:
Huancabamba, Huancabamba Province, a town in northern Peru.
Huancabamba, Oxapampa Province, a town in central Peru.
Huancabamba District, Huancabamba, a district in the Huancabamba Province in Peru.
Huancabamba District, Oxapampa, a district in the Oxapampa Province in Peru.
Huancabamba Province, a province in northern Peru.
Huancabamba River, a river in Peru.
Huancabamba Depression, a depression in the Andes mountain range.